Folk Songs With Ed McCurdy is a Canadian
television series which aired on CBC Television in 1961.

Premise
This Halifax-based production was hosted by folk singer Ed McCurdy who performed on some of the earliest broadcasts on CBC Television. Performance of folk songs were accompanied by discussion of their background.

Scheduling
This 15-minute series was broadcast Saturdays at 6:30 p.m. (Eastern) from 1 July to 16 September 1961.

References

External links
 

CBC Television original programming
1961 Canadian television series debuts
1961 Canadian television series endings
Folk music mass media
Canadian folk music
1960s Canadian music television series